Bhagnari is a Hindu Baloch community living in India. They trace their origin to Southern Balochistan. They migrated to India after Partition.

History
The Bhagnaris were inhabitants of the city of Bhag in the plains of southern Balochistan. They migrated to areas including Sindh and Punjab, and eventually settled down in Karachi in around 1870s. After Partition, they migrated to India and settled in Mumbai and several other parts of India. Now they are spread to other countries with Indian immigrant communities such as the UAE, USA, Canada, and Australia.

Shree Bhagnari Panchayat
Shree Bhagnari Panchayat is the association of the Bhagnari community. It was formed by Takandas Hemraj Kataria, who helped the Bhagnari community to migrate from Pakistan. He also built Kataria Colony in Mumbai for Bhagnari families. The road connecting Matunga East with the Veer Savarkar Marg in Mahim is named TH Kataria Marg in his memory.

Demographics
The community consists of around a thousand families. They reside in Mahim, mainly in Kataria Colony in Veer Savarkar Marg, Mahim, which was built in 1961 as well as several other parts of Mumbai, India and many other countries in the world, mainly UAE, USA, Canada, Australia, etc.

See also
 Baloch people in India
 Hinduism in Balochistan

References

External links
 https://ebhagnaris.in

Baloch tribes
Ethnic groups in India
Baloch diaspora in India